Oedelem is a town in Beernem, a part of West Flanders, Belgium.

Gallery

External links

Oedelem at City Review

Populated places in West Flanders
Beernem